Richard Robbins may refer to:

Richard Robbins (anthropologist) (born 1940), teaching professor of anthropology at SUNY Plattsburgh
Richard Robbins (composer) (1940–2012), American film score composer
Richard Robbins (poet), American poet
Richard E. Robbins, American filmmaker and documentarian
Richard Robbins (artist) (1927–2009), British artist, sculptor and art teacher
C. Richard Robins (1928–2020), American ichthyologist